"The Cliffs of Old Tynemouth" is a Geordie folk song written in the 19th century by David Ross Lietch. This song is a ballad, romanticising about one of the tourist sights of the Tyneside area.

Lyrics 

This song appears in a small pamphlet or chapbook being Number 2 of a series appearing to consist of only 3, forming a series of 'Shields' songs. They were published in the 1850s by the Shields Gazette editor, William Brockie. The songs reflect the towns of Cullercoats, Tynemouth,  North Shields and South Shields, small coastal towns on both sides of the Tyne. All are variously famous for fishwives, press gangs, ships, boats and sailors, and beautiful scenery.  The song was written in 1843.

"The Cliffs of Old Tynemouth"
To the tune of the Irish Air “The Meeting of the Waters”:

Tune: "The meeting of the waters".

Places mentioned in the song 
Tynemouth is the town at the mouth of the River Tyne
Rocks may refer to the “Black Midden rocks" which over the years have claimed numerous ships attempting to sail into the Tyne.
Abbey refers to the Tynemouth Priory  originally built by Oswald, King and saint of Northumbria in 637 A.D.

Comments on variations to the above version 

In the early 19th century, as today, there were cheap books and magazines.
Many of these “Chapbooks” were on poor quality paper to a poor standard and with poor quality print. The works were copied with no thoughts of copyright, and the work required very little proof-reading, and what was done was not required to a high standard. Consequently, the dialect words of songs varied between editions.
This particular song shows several variations between the various published versions, some very minor, mainly in the spelling of the words, some are interpretation of the dialect, some down to simple mistakes, and sometimes there are variations within the same edition. Some of the most common are listed below :
 Verse 1, Line 3 - ruin'd and ruined
Verse 1, Line 4 - alternatives are "Tis the joy of my fancy" or "Tis the star of my fancy"
Verse 3, Line 2 - alternatives are "o'er the bright sand" and "o'er the bright strand"
Verse 3, Line 3 - alternatives are "And sweet were the echoes, the dark Cliffs above” and "And sweet were the echoes of the dark Cliffs above,"
Verse 3, Line 4 - alternatives are "But sweeter her voice" or "But oh!, sweeter her voice" (with or without an exclamation mark)
 Verse 5, Line 1 - alternatives are "but naught can be seen" or "-- naught can be seen"
Verse 5, Line 1 - nought often spelt naught
Verse 5, Line 2 - alternatives are "Like the place where our first love" or "Like the shore where our first love"
Verse 5, Line 3 - alternates are "Oh! give me the rocks" or "Oh! give me the Cliffs"

Recordings

 MWM Records website. The version performed by soprano  Sheila Armstrong is set to a different tune.  The CD “The Day We Went To The Coast - Around Cullercoats Bay” (ref MWMCDSP35) which includes “The Cliffs of Old Tynemouth” together with 13 other titles - (http://www.mawson-wareham.com/player.php?play=mwmcdsp3506&tkid=664&aid=0&pid=101).

See also 
Geordie dialect words

References

External links
 FARNE - Folk Archive Resource North East
 Wor Geordie songwriters
Allan’s Illustrated Edition of Tyneside songs and readings 1891

English folk songs
Songs related to Newcastle upon Tyne
1843 songs
Northumbrian folklore
Tynemouth